Tyreke Wilson (born 2 December 1999) is a Republic of Ireland footballer who plays as a defender for Shelbourne.

Career
As a youth player, Wilson joined the youth academy of Irish third tier side Cherry Orchard. In 2013, he joined the youth academy of Manchester City in the English Premier League. Before the 2020 season, he signed for Irish club Waterford.

On 18th November 2022 he signed for Shelbourne where he would play alongside his brother John Ross.

Personal life
Wilson is the brother of footballer John Ross Wilson and the son of footballer Karl Wilson.

References

External links
 

1999 births
Association football defenders
Bohemian F.C. players
Expatriate footballers in England
League of Ireland players
Living people
Republic of Ireland association footballers
Republic of Ireland expatriate association footballers
Waterford F.C. players
Shelbourne F.C. players